West Greene School District is a small, rural, public school district located in Greene County, Pennsylvania. It includes Morris Township, Center Township, Gray Township, Jackson Township, Gilmore Township, Freeport Township, Springhill Township, Aleppo Township, and Richhill Township. According to 2000 federal census data, it serves a resident population of 5,917. By 2010, the district's population declined to 5,102 people. In 2009, the district residents' per capita income was $14,228, while the median family income was $35,149 a year. The educational attainment levels for the population 25 and over were 83.7% high school graduates and 12.9% college graduates.

West Greene School District operates two schools: West Greene Elementary Center and West Greene Junior/Senior High School. West Greene High School students may attend Greene County Career and Technology Center. West Greene School District also operates an online academy in association with Intermediate Unit 1 which is open to students in grades 1 through 12. West Greene Online Academy high school students who complete all program requirements are awarded a West Greene High School diploma and may participate in the West Greene School District's Commencement Exercises. West Greene School District provides full-day kindergarten. West Greene students may attend a cyber academy provided by IU1.

Extracurriculars
West Greene School District offers a wide variety of clubs, activities and sports.

Sports
The district funds:

Boys
Baseball - A
Basketball- AA
Football - A
Rifle - AAAA
Track and Field - AA
Wrestling	- AA

Girls
Basketball - A
Softball - A
Track and Field - AA
Volleyball - A

Middle School Sports

Boys
Basketball
Football
Wrestling	

Girls
Basketball
Softball 
Volleyball

According to PIAA directory July 2012

References 

School districts in Greene County, Pennsylvania
Greene County, Pennsylvania
Education in Greene County, Pennsylvania